Karstedt's catalyst is an organoplatinum compound derived from divinyl-containing disiloxane.  This coordination complex is widely used in hydrosilylation catalysis.  It is a colorless solid that is generally assumed to be a mixture of related Pt(0) alkene complexes. The catalyst is named after Bruce D. Karstedt, who developed it in the early 1970s while working for General Electric.

Applications
Carbon-silicon bonds are often generated via hydrosilylation of alkenes.  This reaction has very important applications to industry. While it is favorable thermodynamically, hydrosilylation does not proceed in the absence of a catalyst, such as Karstedt's catalyst. The catalyst is produced by treatment of chloroplatinic acid by the divinyltetramethyldisiloxane.

The catalyst can also be used in a reductive amination reaction between a carboxylic acid and an amine with phenylsilane as the reducing agent.

Structure and bonding
The oxidation state of the platinum is 0.  Using X-ray crystallography, the structure of  Pt2[(Me2SiCH=CH2)2O]3 has been confirmed.  Each Pt(0) center is surrounded by three alkene ligands provided by three 1,1,3,3-tetramethyl-1,3-divinyldisiloxane ligands.  The Pt center and six coordinated carbon atoms are approximately coplanar, as found for simpler complexes such as Pt(C2H4)3.

References

Platinum compounds
Homogeneous catalysis
Coordination complexes